KXRP (91.3 FM) is a non-commercial radio station broadcasting a Catholic format. Licensed to Bismarck, North Dakota, United States, the station is currently owned by Real Presence Radio.

References

External links

XRP
XRP
Radio stations established in 2004
2004 establishments in North Dakota
Catholic radio stations
Catholic Church in North Dakota